Luigi Liguori (born 31 March 1998) is an Italian football player.

Club career

Napoli

Loan to Cosenza and Fidelis Andria 
On 18 July 2017, Liguori was signed by Serie C club Cosenza on a season-long loan deal. On 30 July he made his professional debut as a substitute replacing Gennaro Tutino in the 59th minute of a 3–2 home defeat, after extra-time, against Alessandria in the first round of Coppa Italia. On 26 August he made his Serie C debut for Cosenza as a substitute replacing Giuseppe Statella in the 66th minute of a 3–1 away defeat against Monopoli. In January 2018, Liguri was re-called to Napoli leaving Cosenza with 9 appearances, all as a substitute.

On 31 January 2018, Liguori was loaned to Serie C side Fidelis Andria on a 6-month loan deal. On 11 February he made his debut for Fidelis Andria as a substitute replacing Lorenzo Longo in the 70th minute of a 2–0 away defeat against Monopoli. Liguori ended his 6-month loan to Fidelis Andria with only 1 appearance.

Bari 
On 1 August 2018, Liguori joined to Serie D side Bari with an undisclosed fee.

Back to Napoli

Loan to Fermana
In the summer 2019, he returned to Napoli. On 15 July 2019, he was loaned to Serie C club Fermana.

Lille
On 1 September 2020, he moved to French club Lille as part of the transfer of Victor Osimhen from Lille to Napoli.

Second loan to Fermana
On 19 September 2020, he returned to Fermana on loan.

Loan to Lecco
On 1 February 2021, he was loaned to Lecco.

Career statistics

Club

References

External links
 

1998 births
Footballers from Naples
Living people
Italian footballers
Cosenza Calcio players
Fermana F.C. players
Calcio Lecco 1912 players
Serie C players
Association football forwards
Italian expatriate footballers
Expatriate footballers in France